Atka is an urban locality (an urban-type settlement) in Khasynsky District of Magadan Oblast, Russia, located on the Kolyma Highway,  by road north of the oblast's administrative center Magadan. Population:

Geography
The sources of the Yama are near Atka and the Maltan river flows northwards to the west of the town. The Maymandzhin Range rises above the northern and eastern sides.  Atka is on the same longitude as the Sydney, Australia, both lying on the 151st meridian.

History
It was granted urban-type settlement status in 1953.

Climate
Atka has a subarctic climate (Köppen climate classification Dfc), with cool, humid summers and severe to extreme winters.

References

Urban-type settlements in Magadan Oblast